Risky may refer to:

 Risky (album), by B'z, or the title song, 1990
 "Risky", a song by Davido from A Good Time, 2019
 "Risky", a song by Lil Durk from 7220, 2022
 "Risky", a song by Saweetie from Pretty Summer Playlist: Season 1, 2021
 Risky Creek, Alaska, United States

See also
 Risky Business (disambiguation)
 Risqué (disambiguation)